Frank Foulkes (born 1899) was a British trade unionist.  One of the most prominent communist trade union leaders in the United Kingdom, he left office after being convicted of involvement in rigging an election.

Foulkes completed an apprenticeship as an electrician and joined the Electrical Trades Union.  He also became active in the Labour Party, and at the 1929 UK general election was an election agent for the party.  However, soon after the election, he instead joined the Communist Party of Great Britain (CPGB).

Foulkes gradually came to prominence in the ETU, initially becoming a shop steward, then serving on branch and district committees before working full-time for the union as an official based in Merseyside.  In 1942, he was elected as the union's national organiser, in which role he became known for his negotiation skills.  This led him, in 1946, to win election as the union's General President.  In 1954, he led a major one-day strike of electricians.  He also served as President of the Confederation of Shipbuilding and Engineering Unions in 1959/60.

In 1959, the union's general secretary, Frank Haxell, also a CPGB member, narrowly won a bid for re-election against Jock Byrne.  Byrne and Frank Chapple took Foulkes, Haxell and thirteen other CPGB members to court, alleging that the election had been fixed.  In 1961, they won the case, and Byrne was installed as general secretary.  Foulkes argued that he had no knowledge of any fraud and so should retain his position, but he lost a second court case in 1962 on the grounds that, given his oversight role, he should have been aware that the election was rigged.  He then decided to take early retirement, receiving a pension from the union despite the opposition of its new leadership.

References

1899 births
Year of death missing
Communist Party of Great Britain members
General Presidents of the Electrical Trades Union (United Kingdom)